Korowai / Torlesse Tussocklands Park is a protected area in Canterbury, New Zealand. Covering around 21,000 hectares, it is located on both sides of State Highway 73, from east of Porters Pass to south of Castle Hill Village.

The park is important for the preservation of South Island high country ecosystems.  It contains:
mountain beech forest
species-rich shrublands
unusual scree plants such as vegetable sheep, penwiper, Haast's scree buttercup, scree lobelia, and scree pea
native grasshoppers, wētā, cockroaches, lizards and butterflies
grassland birds such as kea, New Zealand falcon, and New Zealand pipit
forest birds such as tomtit, rifleman, and pipipi
Trig 'M' is a notable track for the Korowai / Torlesse Tussocklands Park; it is an easy climb through subalpine scrub to a windy summit. From here there is a panoramic view north to the Craigieburn Range, east to Christchurch, and southwest to Lake Coleridge.

References

Protected areas of Canterbury, New Zealand
Parks in Canterbury, New Zealand